The Ministry of the Interior and Public Security is the cabinet-level office of home affairs in Chile, in charge of "maintaining public order, security and social peace" within the country. It is also charged with planning, directing, coordinating, executing, controlling, and informing the domestic policies formulated by the President of Chile. As responsible for local government, the minister supervises all non-elected regional authorities.

Izkia Siches has served as Minister of the Interior and Public Security since 11 March 2022; she is the first woman to hold this position. Her Undersecretary of the Interior is Juan Francisco Galli and the Undersecretary of Regional Development is María Paz Troncoso Pulgar. In the absence (because of travel, death, or other impediment) of the president of Chile, the Minister of the Interior becomes "vice president"; however, this is not a true vice presidential position, but rather a position of a designated acting president, as the post of Vice President of Chile has no existence independent from the Ministership of the Interior since 1833.

History
During the first days of the independence movements, the senior "secretary" of the respective Junta would function as the Secretary of Government. The office officially first came to be on 27 October 1812, when it was one of the two secretariats created by the Constitutional Norms approved on that date.  It was then named Secretariat of the Interior. It was abolished in 1814 by the Spanish authorities when, after the Battle of Rancagua, they re-asserted royal power.

In 1818, after independence, the secretariat was re-established, but this time as a "Ministry of Government" (1817–18) later renamed  "Ministry of the Interior and Foreign Affairs" (1829–71). During this period, its functions normally subsumed the future Ministry of Foreign Affairs, which was separated as an independent government administration in 1871. This ministry has undergone several reorganizations during its long history, reflected in its different names:

Ministry of Government (1817–18)
Ministry of Government and Foreign Affairs (1818–29)
Ministry of the Interior and Foreign Affairs (1829–71)
Ministry of the Interior  (1871–2011)
Ministry of the Interior and Public Security (2011–present)

The function of chief of government was unofficially assumed by the Minister of the Interior and Public Security (1891–1925).

List of Ministers

Patria Vieja period

Ministers of Government and Foreign Affairs

Ministers of the Interior and Foreign Affairs

Ministers of the Interior

Additional information

See also
Foreign relations of Chile
Ministry of Foreign Affairs of Chile

Sources

References

External links
Official Website of the Ministry of the Interior of Chile  

Home Affairs and Public Security
Chile
Law enforcement in Chile
Chile, Home Affairs and Public Security
Chile, Home Affairs and Public Security
1812 establishments in the Captaincy General of Chile